Nia Imara is an American astrophysicist, artist, and activist. Imara's scientific work deals with galactic mass, star formation, and exoplanet detection. Imara was the first African-American woman to earn a PhD in astrophysics at the University of California, Berkeley and was the inaugural postdoctoral fellow in the Future Faculty Leaders program at Harvard University. In 2020, Imara joined the University of California, Santa Cruz as an Assistant Professor in the Department of Astronomy.

Early life and education 
Imara was born in East Oakland, Oakland, California and grew up in the San Francisco Bay Area. She received her bachelor's degree from Kenyon College in 2003, majoring in mathematics and physics. While at Kenyon College, she competed on the college's swim team. She moved to the University of California, Berkeley for her postgraduate studies, and in 2010 she became the first African-American woman to earn a PhD in astrophysics at University of California, Berkeley. Her dissertation was on The Formation and Evolution of Giant Molecular Clouds and was supervised by Leo Blitz.

Career
From 2014 to 2017, Imara was the inaugural postdoctoral fellow in the Future Faculty Leaders program at Harvard University. Her postdoctoral research focused on giant molecular clouds, the birth sites of stars, and the properties and cosmological effects of galactic and intergalactic dust. She used the world's largest fully steerable radio telescope, the Robert C. Byrd Green Bank Telescope, to conduct her research.

In 2017, she was appointed as the John Harvard Distinguished Science Fellow and the Harvard FAS Dean's Postdoctoral Fellow at the Harvard–Smithsonian Center for Astrophysics. Imara works with the Banneker Institute at Harvard, and is a member of the Breakthrough Starshot research team. Her work investigates the structure and evolution of stellar nurseries in both the Milky Way Galaxy and other galaxies throughout the universe, and she has developed a model that connects galaxy mass, star formation rates and dust temperatures.

In Fall 2020, Imara joined the faculty in the Astronomy and Astrophysics Department at the University of California, Santa Cruz.

Together with Rosanne Di Stefano, Imara proposed a method for detecting exoplanets in X-ray binary star systems. Imara, Di Stefano, and their other collaborators found evidence, using the Chandra X-Ray Observatory, of a potential planet passing in front of a star that is 28 million light-years away in the M51 galaxy. Their findings were published to Nature Astronomy in an October 2021 paper entitled "A possible planet candidate in an external galaxy detected through X-ray transit." If the findings are confirmed, this would represent the first sighting of a planet outside of our Milky Way Galaxy.

Activism & Community Engagement 
Imara is an advocate for equity in STEM. She founded the Equity and Inclusion Journal Club at Harvard University in 2018 which was originally co-organized with Dr. Anna Pancoast. She has visited South Africa and Ghana to teach and advocate in programs designed to increase diversity in astronomy and other STEM areas.

In 2020, Imara founded Onaketa, an organization that connects students from underserved communities of color with free math and science tutoring.

Imara has described the field of astronomy as a uniquely powerful tool for engaging the general public with, and expanding access to, science: "Everyone’s captivated by astronomy, by the stars, what’s out there in the universe...And so I made a conscious choice a long time ago that I wanted to share my work with the community, with Black folks and other people of color, especially.” Imara recently appeared as herself in the "Age of Stars" episode of the 2021 PBS Nova documentary series "Universe Revealed,"  as well as a short segment in Ancient Skies "Gods and Monsters" (TV Episode 2019).

References

External links

African-American scientists
University of California, Berkeley alumni
Kenyon College alumni
Artists from Oakland, California
Harvard University people
Scientists from the San Francisco Bay Area
American astrophysicists
Women astrophysicists
21st-century American physicists
20th-century American women scientists
African-American activists
African-American women artists
20th-century American painters
21st-century American painters
21st-century American women scientists
20th-century African-American women
20th-century African-American painters
21st-century African-American women
African-American physicists